Buljol is a salad dish of the cuisine of Trinidad and Tobago. It consists of chopped salted cod, tomatoes and chilies. The name does not relate to the temperature of the dish (it is served cold) but to its spiciness, caused by the added hot pepper. 

In colonial times buljol was considered a poor man's food, but nowadays it is used as a breakfast ingredient, being eaten with toast or fried bake. From Trinidad the use of buljol has spread to other Caribbean islands (especially Barbados) and Trinidadian communities in English-speaking countries such as Canada, Great Britain and the United States.

The skin and bones of the salted cod are removed, then it is cooked or repeatedly soused with cooking water to remove as much of the salt as possible. The fish is then shredded and mixed with chopped tomatoes and chilies. Additional ingredients are added to taste with onions, bell peppers and olive oil being prevalent, but also garlic, hard-boiled eggs, lemon juice, lettuce, white wine and various herbs are used. Instead of codfish sometimes pollock or hake are used.

See also

 Bacalhau
List of salads

References

External links 
 Illustrated recipe on CaribbeanPot.com
Buljol Recipe on TriniInXisle.com

Trinidad and Tobago cuisine
Salads
Fish dishes